Kazuyuki is a masculine Japanese given name. Notable people with the name include:

Kazuyuki Akasaka (born 1989), Japanese baseball player
Kazuyuki Atsuzawa (born 1972), Japanese retired baseball player
, Japanese screenwriter
Kazuyuki Fujita (born 1970), Japanese professional wrestler, mixed martial artist and former amateur wrestler
Kazuyuki Hoashi (born 1979), Japanese baseball pitcher
, Japanese swimmer
Kazuyuki Izutsu (born 1952), Japanese film director, screenwriter and film critic
, Japanese footballer and wheelchair basketball player
Kazuyuki Morisaki (born 1981), Japanese football player
Kazuyuki Nakane (born 1969), Japanese politician
, Japanese voice actor
Kazuyuki Sogabe (1948-2006), Japanese voice actor
Kazuyuki Toda (born 1977), Japanese football player

Japanese masculine given names